Klaus Merk (born 26 April 1967) is a German ice hockey player. He competed in the men's tournaments at the 1994 Winter Olympics and the 1998 Winter Olympics.

References

External links
 

1967 births
Living people
Olympic ice hockey players of Germany
Ice hockey players at the 1994 Winter Olympics
Ice hockey players at the 1998 Winter Olympics
Sportspeople from Augsburg
Augsburger Panther players
Starbulls Rosenheim players